Alston Arches Viaduct, also known as Haltwhistle Viaduct, is a stone bridge across the River South Tyne at Haltwhistle in Northumberland, England.

History
The bridge, which has four stone arches, was designed by Sir George Barclay Bruce as a railway bridge.

It formed part of the Alston Line and was completed in March 1851. The railway closed in May 1976 and the bridge was re-opened by the Duke of Gloucester for pedestrian use in July 2006. It is a Grade II listed structure.

References

Bridges in Northumberland
Crossings of the River Tyne
Former railway bridges in the United Kingdom
Haltwhistle